Pimple Saudagar  is a neighbourhood in the city of Pune, India. Situated from Chinchwad and closeby prominent suburbs of Baner and Aundh, the locality is a progressive residential area that attracts the newer population of the city.

Its proximity to the Rajiv Gandhi Infotech Park located at Hinjawadi makes it a residential hub for people working in the Information Technology industry.

History
Pimple Saudagar was earlier an underdeveloped area. From the late 1990s, the area grew to catch up with the vast industrialization and expansion of the Pune city.  The introduction of the Rajiv Gandhi Infotech Park in Hinjawadi in 2003 sparked a tremendous real estate growth in the region favored by IT professionals. and it has become a golden crown of Pimpri-Chinchwad having high life standard.

Geography and Climate
Pimple Saudagar is located on relatively flat land. The Pavana River cuts through the northern areas of the locality. The Pavana dam on the river is the major source of water for this area, however, water shortage is being experienced in recent years due to the expanding population and water usage. The suburbs bordering Pimple Saudagar are Pimpri, Rahatani to the north, Wakad to the west, Pimple Nilakh to the south and Pimple Gurav, Sangvi to the east. The climate of Pimple Saudagar is almost identical to that of Pune as a whole.

Transportation
Pimple Saudagar is well connected to the rest of the city by public transportation. PMPML buses shuttle across the area frequently, connecting it with other areas of the city however buses are not in good condition. Auto Rickshaws are also available however it is difficult to convince them sometimes to run on meter. Pimple Saudagar is traversed by the Nashik Phata road, connecting the area with Kasarvadi, a major road junction. The road follows west to connect the area with Wakad, leading to Hinjawadi.

The Rainbow BRTS bus system is now operational in Pimple Saudagar since November 2015.
The Kasarwadi railway station is nearby to residents of Pimple Saudagar. All local trains between Pune Junction railway station and Lonavala railway station stop at Kasarwadi station.

Education
Some primary schools and Pre-primary schools affiliated to Maharashtra state board have been developed in this locality in the past few years. Many schools affiliated to national education boards ICSE and CBSE have been established within the area limits.

Schools
 VIBGYOR Roots and Rise Pimple Saudagar
 Sai School of Excellence
 SNBP School
 PK School
 Gurukul School
 Challenger Public School
 Go Getter Kids Preschool

Apartment Complexes
 Dwarka Queen's Park
 Sai Nisarg Park Phase I & II
 Ganeesham Phase I & II
 Mayureshwar
 Shubham Society
 Roseland Residency
 Rose Valley
 Rose icon
 Atul Alcove
 Kunal Icon
 Subashree Woods
 Dwarka Sai Paradise
 Dwarka Sai Heritage
 Sai Saheb
 Lakshmi Angan
 Sai Marigold
 Sai Vishwa
 Westford
 Tushar Residency
 Poorva Residency
 Vasanta Bhavan
 The Crest

Hospitals
 Ruby Hall Clinic
 Doctor To home & clinic(DTH)
 Healing Touch Hospital
 Lotus Multispeciality Hospital
 Acme Dental Lounge
 Bright Smiles Dental & Implant Care
 Omkar Khalane Multispeciality Hospital
 VitaLife Clinic
 B Positive Physiotherapy Clinic
 Galaxy Hospital
 Geeta's Advanced Dental Clinic

Public Parks
 Savitri Bai Phule Udyan
 Shri Sambhaji PCMC Garden 
 Pimple Saudagar Linear Garden, Kokane Chowk to Kate Patil Chowk

See also
 Pimple Gurav
 Aundh
 Thergaon
 Pimpri
 Wakad
 Hinjawadi
 Kalewadi
 Chinchwad (Vidhan Sabha constituency)

References

Washaton Laundry

Neighbourhoods in Pimpri-Chinchwad